Bohemian Football Club, more commonly referred to as Bohemians or Bohs, is a professional football club from Dublin, Ireland. Bohemians compete in the Premier Division of the League of Ireland, and are the oldest League of Ireland club in continuous existence. Bohs are the fourth most successful club in League of Ireland football history, having won the League of Ireland title 11 times, the FAI Cup 7 times, the League of Ireland Shield 6 times and the League of Ireland Cup 3 times. Prior to the establishment of the Football Association of Ireland and League of Ireland, Bohemians competed in the Irish Football League and Irish Cup, which were at the time all-Ireland competitions. During that period they won the Irish Cup once and finished runners up 5 times. They hold the record for Leinster Senior Cup wins with 32 cups claimed.

Bohemians were founded by members of the Bell's Academy civil service training college, the Royal Hibernian Military School, medical students and others, on 6 September 1890 in the Phoenix Park Gate Lodge beside the North Circular Road entrance and played its first games in the Park's Polo Grounds. They were one of the founding members of the League of Ireland in 1921, after their withdrawal from the Irish Football League. They established themselves as a major force within the first 15 years of the League of Ireland, winning 5 league titles, 2 FAI Cups and 4 Shields, but struggled for decades after that, largely due to their strict amateur status, going 34 seasons without winning a major trophy. Bohemians dropped their amateur ethos in 1969 and proceeded to win 2 League titles, 2 FAI Cups, and 2 League cups during the 1970s. They suffered a further decline throughout the 1980s and most of the 1990s before claiming League and Cup doubles in 2001 and 2008, alongside the 2003 and most recently 2009 title wins.

Bohemians play their home matches at Dalymount Park in Phibsborough on the northside of Dublin. They are owned 100% by the members of the club. Their club colours are red and black, which they adopted at the 4th AGM in October 1893. Bohemians supporters often refer to their club by a number of nicknames including Bohs and The Gypsies, and provide one half of a bitter rivalry with southside club, Shamrock Rovers.

History

Bohemians were founded on 6 September 1890. They were members of the Irish Football League from 1902 to 1911 (the first club from Dublin to join) and from 1912 to 1920.  During this time the club's greatest success was winning the Irish Cup in 1908.

It was a founding member of the League of Ireland in 1921, and it is one of only two clubs to have been members of the League of Ireland since its inception (the other being Shelbourne), and it is the only club to have been ever-present in the top division of the league. In its first season it finished second in the league, just two points behind St. James Gate. The club won its first league title in 1924. In 1928 the club won its second league title and completed a double that season by winning its first FAI Cup also.  The club was one of the major forces in the early years of the league, going on to win another three league titles and another FAI Cup in the next eight seasons.

After this success the club began to struggle, often finishing at the foot of the league and rarely mounting a title challenge, largely because of an inability to attract or keep top players due to its strict amateur status, which had been a fundamental part of the club since its formation.  The club went 34 seasons without winning a major trophy.  In 1969 the club ended its amateur status, and the first player to sign professional terms was Tony O'Connell, who signed on 11 March 1969.

The club then went on to win two league titles, two FAI Cups and two league cups in the 1970s, more trophies than any other club that decade. In 1970 the club entered European competition for the first time where it was beaten in the first qualifying round of the European Cup Winners' Cup (see below). The club went through another trophy-less spell after its 1979 league cup victory, which was not broken until the club won its fifth FAI Cup in 1992.  It was not until 2001 that it regained the league title, also winning the FAI Cup that season to complete its second double. After adding another league title in 2003, Bohemians triumphed once again in 2008, under Pat Fenlon, winning the double of both the league for the tenth time with four league games still to play, and the FAI cup in a penalty shoot-out.
In September 2009, Bohemians claimed the League Cup for the third time in the club's history with a 3–1 win over Waterford United in the final.

On 6 November 2009, Bohemians retained the title after a 1–1 draw against Bray Wanderers. They were already assured of the league title before the final round of matches as they held a three-point lead and 16-goal difference advantage over their nearest rivals Shamrock Rovers. Captain Owen Heary collected the Premier Division trophy for the club's first back-to-back league win. Bohs narrowly missed out on a hat trick of league titles on goal difference in 2010 in a season which also seen them suffer European disappointment at the hands of Welsh club TNS.

Stadiums
Bohemians' first permanent home ground was on the Polo Ground in Phoenix Park. Goal posts and other equipment were kept at Gate Lodge on North Circular Road (Dublin). They remained there until the 1893–94 season when they obtained a private ground on Jones Road now known as Croke Park, the headquarters of the Gaelic Athletic Association. The space then took in the ground previously occupied by the Old Belvedere playing pitches and now occupied by the Cusack Stand. For the first time it was possible for the club to build up some sort of finances, since a charge for admission was made at all important home matches.

They moved to a new home at Whitehall Farm, Glasnevin, in time for the start of the 1895–96 season but in those days, the area was out of the way and without public transport so the Bohemian committee continued to look for a new home ground. Their search came to an end when they moved to Dalymount Park which was officially opened on 7 September 1901.

In 2006 the club's members decided to sell Dalymount Park to developer Liam Carroll in a reported €65,000,000 deal, although then board members refused to allow members to see the details of the deal. The deal included the development of a new 10,000-seater stadium in Harristown near Dublin Airport. On 7 November 2008, Bohemians lost a court case versus Albion Ltd, when it was discovered that the board, led by Gerry Cuffe and Gerry Conway, had attempted to re-sell part of the ground which the club no longer owned, which has had the effect of putting the move on hold long enough for the property market to collapse and the deal to be all but dead. In March 2015 Dublin City Council announced that it would purchase Dalymount park. The Council completed the purchase in June 2015 for €3.8million. In February 2016 the Council published plans to demolish and rebuild Dalymount on a phased basis at a cost of €20 million. It is likely that Bohemians would need to play elsewhere during redevelopment.

European record
Although they did not make their first appearance in European competition until 1970, they have, like all Irish clubs, found the going tough in Europe, but they have had some famous successes too. Their finest hour came when they eliminated Scottish Premier League club (and former Cup Winners' Cup and European Super Cup champions) Aberdeen from the UEFA Cup in August 2000. That triumph was set up by a dramatic 2–1 victory away from home, in which Bohs scored 2 late goals to overturn a 1–0 deficit. That was the first time an Irish club defeated British opposition away from home in European competition. Other notable results include wins against Rangers and Kaiserslautern (away) and draws against Rangers, Newcastle United, Sporting CP, Dundee United (away) and Aberdeen. In all, they have beaten a total of 11 different teams, from 9 countries (Denmark, Cyprus, Scotland, Germany, Estonia, Belarus, Belgium, Wales and Latvia). Bohs bowed out of the 2008 Intertoto Cup on away goals to Latvian side FK Riga despite winning the second leg 2–1. Earlier in that campaign they recorded their biggest single leg (5–1) and aggregate (9–3) wins in Europe (against Welsh Premier League club Rhyl).

Bohemians started their 2009–10 UEFA Champions League campaign away to Austrian Bundesliga champions Red Bull Salzburg on 16 July 2009 with a 1–1 draw in Salzburg.
In the second leg on 22 July 2009, Bohemians held out until an 87th-minute goal by Patrik Ježek for Red Bull Salzburg gave them a one-nil victory on the night and two one win on aggregate.
After retaining the league title in 2009, Bohs entered the Champions League again in 2010–11. They were drawn against Welsh side The New Saints in the Second Qualifying Round, and won the first leg 1–0 at Dalymount Park on 13 July 2010. They lost the second leg 4–0 and were eliminated 4–1 on aggregate. Bohs manager Pat Fenlon later labelled the performance as 'disgraceful' and said 'the players let the club, league and country down'. The result was labelled by others as the worst result in Bohs' 40-year European history.

After a nearly a decade away from continental competition, Bohs faced Hungarian opposition in the form of Fehérvár in the 2020-2021 UEFA Europa League qualifiers. The gypsies narrowly missed out by virtue of a penalty shoot-out loss, decided after a solitary one-legged affair was played, due to the Coronavirus pandemic. Bohs entered the inaugural Europa Conference League the year after and consecutively sold out their home matches at Dublin's Aviva Stadium in matches with Stjarnan FC and F91 Dudelange, both home legs ending with famous 3-0 victories.

Overview

Matches

Supporters and rivalries

Bohs' fan base is mainly drawn from the northside of Dublin and their supporters share a bitter rivalry with Southside club, Shamrock Rovers. However, the club has many fans from other parts of the city, across Ireland and worldwide. The club shares a rivalry with their Northside neighbours Shelbourne largely because of geographical proximity as both clubs are now located roughly just 1 mile apart, and also because they featured prominently in the early days of Dublin football, when nationwide football was still based around Belfast. Shelbourne and Bohs were often featured in the Belfast-centered Irish Football League before partition and the rivalry was kept on-off after they formed the new Irish Free State league with Shamrock Rovers and other clubs.

During 2006, a number of Bohemians fans formed an ultra group in an effort to create a more interesting atmosphere at home games. Ironically named The Notorious Boo-Boys (or NBB, a term used by journalists to disparage the patience of Bohs fans), the group bought flags and organised displays during games to lift the atmosphere of the home of Irish football Dalymount Park. The fans have friendly contacts with Prague club Bohemians 1905, Welsh club Wrexham AFC, Swedish club Malmö FF as well as English non-league and fellow supporter owned club FC United of Manchester.

The club boasts some well known supporters such as Johnny Logan, Samuel L. Jackson, Aslan's Christy Dignam, alternative band Royseven, as well as musicians Brush Shiels, Rob Smith and novelist Irvine Welsh. The club also has a working relationship with Hibernian FC of Edinburgh.

Women

On 27 November 2018 Bohemians have been accepted to compete in the Under-17 Women's National League beginning with the 2019 season.
The aim is to grow the number of girls and ladies members in the club and eventually compete in the Women's National League.
The historic first game in the Under-17 Women's National League for Bohemians was played on 13 April 2019 against Cork City and ended in 0–2 defeat.

Just one year after being accepted to compete in the Under-17 Women's National League, Bohemians was accepted to the Women's National League on 18 February 2020. The first match was originally scheduled for 15 March 2020, however, the team was made to wait until 8 August 2020 due to the COVID-19 pandemic in the Republic of Ireland which delayed the start of the season. The game ended in a 4–1 defeat to Wexford Youth. Chloe Darby scored the consolation goal and wrote herself into the history books as Bohemians' first-ever goalscorer.

Bohemians Academy

Bohemians compete with an elite team in the SSE Airtricity National Under-19 League. In an exclusive partnership with schoolboy club St Kevin's Boys they field an elite team as Bohemians/St Kevins Boys in the SSE Airtricity National Under-17 League, SSE Airtricity National Under-15 League and SSE Airtricity National Under-13 League.
Beyond the elite teams, Bohemians have worked hard to build youth structures from the bottom up. The club has increased its participation numbers within the community through the Academy (ages 4–7), Girls Academy (ages 7–12), and youth teams (ages 7–15).

Academy Staff

Bohemians Youth
Bohemians youth section has about 250 players from the ages of 8 to 17. The club runs 15 teams who play in the DDSL. The youth director is Conor Emerson who, along with the support of Bohemians, announced a 5-year partnership with DCU to national media coverage. This partnership will see Bohemians' youth teams training in and using DCU facilities, "learning the game like the first team do". The partnership also included a scholarship system which will see Bohs players being offered scholarships to DCU. Since 2011 this partnership has ended and Bohemians are now currently training in Royal College of Surgeons close to the airport. The main aim of the youth section is to produce players who are good enough to play for the first team.

Bohemian Futsal
Bohemian Futsal compete in the AUL Futsal Premier Division, the winners of which compete in the UEFA Futsal Champions League preliminary rounds. Bohs also have a 'B' team that compete in the AUL Futsal Division One. They are the only League of Ireland club with a futsal club.

Players

Current squad

Out on loan

Player statistics

Captains

Player of the Year
Bohemian's Player of the Year award is voted for by the club's supporters at the end of every season.

Technical staff

Honours
 League of Ireland/Premier Division 11:
 1923–24, 1927–28, 1929–30, 1933–34, 1935–36, 1974–75, 1977–78, 2000–01, 2002–03, 2008, 2009
 FAI Cup 7:
 1927–28, 1934–35, 1969–70, 1975–76, 1991–92, 2000–01, 2008
 Irish Cup: 1
 1907–08
 League of Ireland Cup: 3
 1974–75, 1978–79, 2009
 League of Ireland Shield: 6
 1923–24, 1927–28, 1928–29, 1933–34, 1938–39, 1939–40
 Setanta Sports Cup: 1
 2010
 LFA President's Cup: 13
 1965–66, 1967–68, 1974–75, 1975–76, 1976–77, 1977–78, 1978–79, 1982–83, 1992–93, 1994–95, 1997–98, 2000–01, 2001–02
 Dublin City Cup: 1
 1935–36
 Dublin and Belfast Intercity Cup: 1
 1944–45
 Top Four Cup: 1
 1971–72
 Aciéries d'Angleur Trophy: 1
 1929
 Leinster Senior League: 8
 1899–1900, 1900–01, 1901–02, 1904–05, 1912–13, 1913–14, 1917–18, 1931–32
 Leinster Senior Cup: 32 (record)
 1893–94, 1894–95, 1895–96, 1896–97, 1897–98, 1898–99, 1901–02, 1902–03, 1904–05, 1906–07, 1909–10, 1910–11, 1911–12, 1914–15, 1915–16, 1925–26, 1927–28, 1939–40, 1946–47, 1965–66, 1966–67, 1972–73, 1974–75, 1975–76, 1978–79, 1979–80, 1983–84, 1985–86, 1988–89, 1992–93, 1997–98, 2015–16
 FAI Intermediate Cup: 1
 1931–32
 FAI Youth Cup
 1969–70, 2001–02, 2014–15: 3

Records

 Record League Points Tally 85 in season 2008 (33 games) (record total and 19-point record margin)
 Record League Victory 10–1 (h) v University College Dublin (16 August 2019)
 Record Leinster Senior Cup Victory 11–0 v Grangegorman (26 December 1946) (Leinster Senior Cup Final)
 League defeat: 0–5 v St Patrick's Athletic, 6 December 1996
 Record League Goal scorer Glen Crowe – 133 goals
 Record League Goal scorer in one Season Glen Crowe – 25 goals in 2000–01
 Most appearances (player): 575, Tommy Kelly
 Most goals (player): 192, Turlough O'Connor
 Youngest Player Evan Ferguson – 14 years 337 days (20 September 2019 vs Derry City in the League of Ireland Premier Division)
 Oldest player: 40, Gary Matthews
 First goalscorer: Joseph Whelan v Britannia, 1 November 1890
 Quickest Red Card: Gareth Fleming 8 minutes v St Patricks Athletic, 2001

League of Ireland Placing History

Managerial history 

  Seán Thomas (1964–67)
  Pat Murphy (May 1967 – April 68)
  Seán Thomas (1968–73)
  Billy Young (1973–89)
  Padraig O'Connor (1989–90)
  Eamonn Gregg (1990–93)
  Turlough O'Connor (1993–98)
  Joe McGrath (1998)
  Roddy Collins (1998–01)
  Pete Mahon (2001)
  Stephen Kenny (2001–04)
  Gareth Farrelly (2004–06)
  Sean Connor (17 Nov 2006 – 19 Dec 2007)
  Pat Fenlon (22 Dec 2007 – 25 Nov 2011)
  Aaron Callaghan (1 Jan 2012 – 15 July 2013)
  Owen Heary (interim) (16 July 2013 – Sept 12, 2013)
  Bobby Browne (Sep 2013 – Nov 2013)
  Owen Heary (Jan 2014 – Nov 2014)
  Keith Long (Nov 2014 – Aug 2022)
  Derek Pender (interim) (Aug 2022 – Oct 2022)
  Declan Devine (Oct 2022 – )

References

External links
 Bohemian FC official website
 Gypsies Trust launched, news on the launch of the Gypsies Supporters Trust 
 Dublin & District Schoolboys League

 
Association football clubs established in 1890
Association football clubs in Dublin (city)
League of Ireland Premier Division clubs
Former senior Irish Football League clubs
1890 establishments in Ireland
Fan-owned football clubs
Former Leinster Senior League clubs